The Snake River Range is located in the U.S. states of Wyoming and Idaho and includes 10 mountains over . The range trends northwest to southeast and is bordered on the north by the Teton Range and the two ranges meet at Teton Pass. The Snake River Range is bordered by the Palisades Reservoir to the west and the Snake River, which sweeps completely around the eastern, southern and western part of the range. Along the southern boundary, the Snake River passes through Grand Canyon, also known as the Snake River Canyon. U.S. Route 26/U.S. Route 89 follows the course of the Snake River from Hoback Junction to the Palisades Reservoir.

See also
 List of mountain ranges in Wyoming
 List of mountain ranges in Idaho

References

Mountain ranges of Wyoming
Mountain ranges of Idaho
Bridger–Teton National Forest
Caribou-Targhee National Forest